Amiya Patnaik was an Indian filmmaker and producer in the Odia film industry called Ollywood. His notable works were Hakim Babu and Tulasi Apa. The former won the 33rd National Film Awards for Best Feature Film in Odia and the latter winning the Odisha State Film Award in Six Categories.

Career
Patnaik worked prominently in the Odia film industry(Ollywood). He made his directorial debut with "Mamata Mage Mula (1985)". The movie was also his first venture as a producer. Since then he never looked back, he produced films like ‘Hakim Babu(1985)' which bags National award for Best feature film in Odia Category. Back in 2015, Patnaik was decided to come back as director with ‘Tulasi Apa’ which won State Film Awards in six categories including Best film and Best Director. The movie was based on veteran social activist and Padma Shri awardee Tulasi Munda, was released in theatres to critical acclaim in 2017.

Death
Patnaik was diagnosed with pancreatic cancer. He had been undergoing treatment at a private hospital in Gurgaon. When his health was very critical, he shifted to a private hospital in New Delhi where he died at 7.59 am on 19 October 2018.

Filmography

References

External links

Odia film directors
Cinema of Odisha
Odia film producers
People from Odisha
2018 deaths
1955 births